Alioum Boukar (born 3 January 1972) is a Cameroonian former professional footballer who played as a goalkeeper for several clubs, including Canon Yaoundé, Samsunspor and Istanbulspor, both in Turkey. He played for Cameroon national football team and was a participant at the 1998 FIFA World Cup and the 2002 FIFA World Cup. He was also part of the victorious 2000 and 2002 African Cup of Nations squads.

He acquired Turkish citizenship and changed his name to Ali Uyanık.

References

 BBC: World Cup 2002

External links

Living people
1972 births
Footballers from Yaoundé
Association football goalkeepers
Cameroonian footballers
Turkish footballers
Turkish people of Cameroonian descent
Cameroon international footballers
Cameroonian Muslims
Cameroonian expatriate footballers
1996 African Cup of Nations players
1998 FIFA World Cup players
2001 FIFA Confederations Cup players
2002 FIFA World Cup players
1998 African Cup of Nations players
2000 African Cup of Nations players
2002 African Cup of Nations players
Süper Lig players
Coton Sport FC de Garoua players
Canon Yaoundé players
Samsunspor footballers
Konyaspor footballers
Altay S.K. footballers
İstanbulspor footballers
Naturalized citizens of Turkey
Expatriate footballers in Turkey

Cameroon football federation